The Fiordland brotula, Fiordichthys slartibartfasti, is a rare viviparous brotula found only in the Fiordland region of the South Island of New Zealand. This species grows to a length of  SL.

Etymology 
The genus name means fjord fish (fiord + Greek ichthys = fish) while the species name is a references to Slartibartfast, a character from Douglas Adams' 1979 novel The Hitchhiker's Guide to the Galaxy who was one of the designers of the supercomputer Earth, winning an award for his design of the Norwegian fjords.

References
 

Bythitidae
Endemic marine fish of New Zealand
Fish described in 1995